The Holy Rosary Church Rectory at 220 W. Main in Bozeman, Montana is a brick building that was designed by Fred F. Willson and built in 1912.  It was listed on the National Register of Historic Places in 1987. The two-story brick building features Gothic arched windows and a detailed brick design along the roofline, visually linking the rectory to the church. The crenellated (notched) door surround evokes the image of a medieval castle, reinforcing the connection to the Gothic style.

History 
One of the early works of Fred F. Willson, the rectory is derived from 19th century architectural forms. Although individually eligible for the National Register on architecture significance, this Neo-Gothic Revival style rectory is also indicative of the growing early 20th century wealth of the Catholic Church in Bozeman. The building is a significant landmark on Main Street, especially when seen next to the Holy Rosary Church, a large Gothic Revival style church, which is non-contributing due to alteration.

References

Properties of religious function on the National Register of Historic Places in Montana
Gothic Revival architecture in Montana
Buildings and structures in Bozeman, Montana
Roman Catholic Diocese of Helena
1912 establishments in Montana
National Register of Historic Places in Gallatin County, Montana
Houses on the National Register of Historic Places in Montana
Houses in Gallatin County, Montana
Houses completed in 1912
Clergy houses in the United States